Hos Martin (At Martin's) is a Norwegian situation comedy that premiered on TV2 on January 6, 2004.

Plot
Martin (played by Sven Nordin), is an ordinary, uncomplicated man who runs his own café. He is married to Elisabeth (played by Henriette Lien), a determined and conservative woman who always has to have the last word. The other main character of the show is Lars; a theatre actor who makes regular appearances in the café.

Cast

Episodes

Season 1

Season 2

Season 3

Norwegian television sitcoms
TV 2 (Norway) original programming
2004 Norwegian television series debuts
2005 Norwegian television series endings
2000s Norwegian television series